Qohaito (Tigrinya: ቆሓይቶ) was a major ancient city in what is now the Debub region of Eritrea. It was a pre-Aksumite settlement that thrived during the Aksumite period. The city was located over 2,500 meters above sea level, on a high plateau at the edge of the Great Rift Valley. , Qohaito's stone ruins have yet to be excavated. The ancient port city of Adulis is directly to the east, while Matara lies to the south.

History

Rock art near Qohaito appears to indicate habitation in the area since the fifth millennium BC, while the town is known to have survived to the sixth century AD. Mount Emba Soira, Eritrea's highest mountain, lies near the site, as does a small successor village.

Qohaito is often identified as the town Koloe described in the Periplus of the Erythraean Sea, a Greco-Roman document dated to the end of the first century AD. The settlement thrived as a stop on the trade route between Adulis and Aksum. It is thought that crops were interspersed with buildings in the town. These old edifices included the pre-Christian Temple of Mariam Wakino and the Sahira Dam, which might also be pre-Aksumite. 

The ruins at Qohaito were first located in 1868. However, they were at the time erroneously identified as a "Greek depot". A related site outside of Senafe, Matara, lies about 15 kilometers to the south, and was excavated in the 1960s.

See also

Adulis
Keskese
Matara
Nakfa
Sembel
Zula

References

Aksumite cities
Archaeological sites in Eritrea
Southern Region (Eritrea)
Former populated places in Eritrea
History of Eritrea
Ancient Greek geography of East Africa